Other usages: Skylift is an aerial tram or possibly a helicopter or an airlift.

Sky Lift is a science fiction short story by Robert A. Heinlein, first published 1953, and collected in Heinlein's The Menace from Earth.

In the story, a torchship pilot lights out from Earth orbit to Pluto on a mission to deliver a cure to a plague ravaging a research station. Due to the short time needed before everyone at the research station is dead and the long distance involved the torchship must accelerate at multiple gravities for days. The pilot is successful but is rendered an invalid due to the strain put on his body.

References

Fiction set on Pluto
Short stories by Robert A. Heinlein
1953 short stories